Harry Alexander (born 20 July 1939) is a former  Australian rules footballer who played with South Melbourne in the Victorian Football League (VFL).

Notes

External links 

Living people
1939 births
Australian rules footballers from Victoria (Australia)
Sydney Swans players
Sale Football Club players